Anna Maliszewska (born  4 July 1993) is a Polish modern pentathlete. She was born in the west Polish town of Zielona Góra.  Maliszewska won the gold medal in the team event at the 2015 World Modern Pentathlon Championships. She qualified for 2016 Summer Olympics in Rio.

References

External links 
 

1993 births
Living people
Polish female modern pentathletes
Modern pentathletes at the 2016 Summer Olympics
Modern pentathletes at the 2020 Summer Olympics
Olympic modern pentathletes of Poland
Modern pentathletes at the 2010 Summer Youth Olympics
People from Zielona Góra
20th-century Polish women
21st-century Polish women